Jürgen Goslar (26 March 1927 – 5 October 2021) was a German actor and director.

Selected filmography
Actor
 Wo der Wildbach rauscht (1956), as Lorenz Gerold
 Wir Wunderkinder (1958), as Schally Meisegeier
 The Forests Sing Forever (1959), as Lt. Margas
 The Last Witness (1960), as Dr. Heinz Stephan
 The Time Has Come (1960, TV series) as Clive Freeman
 Das Kriminalmuseum: Die Fotokopie (1963, TV series episode), as Kriminalinspektor Breitenfeld
 Das Kriminalmuseum: Der Füllfederhalter (1964, TV series episode), as Kriminalinspektor Manfred Beyer
 Der Kommissar: Anonymer Anruf (1970, TV series episode), as Busse
 Der Kommissar: Die Nacht, in der Basseck starb (1973, TV series episode), as Mario Basseck
 Der Kommissar: Noch zehn Minuten zu leben (1975, TV series episode), as Bottner
 Derrick - Season 3, Episode 9: "Ein unbegreiflicher Typ" (1976, TV), as Herr Schündler
 Derrick - Season 05, Episode 01: "Der Fotograf" (1978, TV), as Blodin
 Derrick - Season 7, Episode 1: "Hanna, liebe Hanna" (1980, TV), as Ewald Balke
 Derrick - Season 10, Episode 3: "Geheimnisse einer Nacht" (1983, TV), as Dr. Albert Vrings
 Das Erbe der Guldenburgs (1987, TV series), as Max von Guldenburg
 The Old Fox: Die Nacht kommt schneller als du denkst (2008, TV series episode), as Adrian Derwand

Director
 Das Mädchen und der Staatsanwalt (1962)
  (1962)
 Terror After Midnight (1962)
  (1967, TV series)
 Die Baumwollpflücker (1970, TV series)
 Diamantendetektiv Dick Donald (1971, TV series)
 Vreemde Wêreld (1974)
 Albino (1976)
 Slavers (1978)

Writer
 Love Nights in the Taiga (1967)
 No Gold for a Dead Diver (dir. Harald Reinl, 1974)

References

External links

Doris Mattes Agency Munich 

1927 births
2021 deaths
People from Oldenburg (city)
German male television actors
German male film actors
20th-century German male actors
21st-century German male actors
Mass media people from Lower Saxony